"The Syndeton Experiment" is a spinoff audio episode of the Blake's 7 British science fiction television series
Syndeton (from the Greek συνδετόν "bound together with") or syndetic coordination in grammar is a form of syntactic coordination of the elements of a sentence (conjuncts) with the help of a coordinating conjunction.

In a simple syndeton, two conjuncts are joined by a conjunction: "I will have eggs and ham".
 
In syndetic coordination with more than two conjuncts, the conjunction is placed between the two last conjuncts: "I will need bread, cheese and ham". The serial comma is not usually used in front of the conjunction between the last two items in British English, while American English generally suggests a comma: "I will need bread, cheese, and ham".

See also
Asyndeton, coordination without conjunctions
Polysyndeton, coordination with many conjunctions

References 

Grammar
Syntax

pt:Oração sindética ou assindética